This is a sub-article to Białystok
Białystok has a number of sports teams, both professional and amateur, and a number of venues across the city. Jagiellonia Białystok is a Polish football club, based in Białystok, in the Ekstraklasa League that plays at the Białystok City Stadium. Jagiellonia Białystok won the Polish Cup in 2010, Super Cup and qualified to play in the third round qualification of the UEFA Europa League. A new 22,500 seat stadium was completed at the end of 2014.

Hetman Białystok (formerly known as Gwardia Bialystok) is a Polish football club based in Podlaskie Voivodeship. They play in the Division IV or the (4th) League at the Białystok City Stadium.

Lowlanders Białystok is a football club, based in Białystok, that plays in the Polish American Football League  PLFA I Conference. The Lowlanders were the champions of the PLFA II Conference in 2010 with a perfect season (8 wins in eight meetings). Because of the win they were advanced to the upper conference (PLFA I) in 2011.

Sport Clubs and Organizations 

 AZS PB
 AZS WSAP
 Aeroklub Białostocki
 Automobilklub Podlaski
 Zakładowy Klub Sportowy "Instal"
 Miejski Ośrodek Sportu i Rekreacji
 Podlaski Klub Taekwondo "So-san"
 Białostocki Ośrodek Japońskich Sztuk Walki "SHOBUKAI"
 Białostocka Drużyna Hokeja na lodzie "ADH Białystok"
 Podlaskie Stowarzyszenie Sportu Osób Niepełnosprawnych "Start" Białystok
 Rowerowy Białystok, cycling association, PTR Dojlidy– MTB Sport Team .
 Makabi Bialystok was a between—the—world—wars Jewish multi—sport club (soccer, basketball and track and field were just a few of types of sport practiced at the club)

Sports Facilities 

 Stadiums and sports halls
 Białystok City Stadium
 Athletic stadium MOSiR
 Stadium KS Włókniarz
 Stadium KKS Ognisko
 Sports and Entertainment Arena at Bialystok Technical University
 Sports Arena at Medical University

 Pools
 MOSiR (Mazowiecka street, Włókiennicza street, Stroma street) (Covered)
 Interschool Sports Centre (Covered)
 BKS Hetman (open)
 Hotel Gołębiewski (swimming trophy "tropicana")

 Tennis Courts
 Tennis Courts "Richi"
 Tennis Courts at Bialystok Technical University
 Tennis Courts Tennis Association "Stanley"
 Tennis Courts MOSiR

 other

 Driver training track (Tor Wschodzący Białystok)
 Sports Club (Ośrodek Sportów Wodnych "Dojlidy")
 Children's Center FIKOLAND & RE-kreacja
 Sport and Recreation Centre "Maniac Gym"
 Skatepark
 Rink (during the summer rolls) MOSiR
 Shooting Range LOK

References

External links